"Moon Over Isla Island" is the second episode of the sixth season of American Dad!, an episode produced for Season 5. It first aired in the United States on Fox on October 4, 2009. This episode mainly centers around Stan, who starts taking advantage of his relationship with Roger on various occasions. Stan is later told to meet up with General Juanito Pequeño, the dictator of a small island nation in the Caribbean. The General suddenly dies of suffocating on a corn dog, so Stan convinces Roger to pretend to be General Pequeño by telling him that they are going on a "friends vacation". While on the island, Roger finds out that Stan has been taking advantage of him again for his own personal gain, and their friendship starts to hang in the balance.

This episode was written by Jonathan Fener and directed by Rodney Clouden. It received mostly positive response from most television critics, with much of the praise stemming from the main storyline, the jokes, and the chemistry between Stan and Roger. This episode was viewed by 6.7 million homes during its original airing, and it acquired a 3.4 rating in the 18-49 demographic. It featured guest appearances from Ricardo Montalbán and Susie Essman, as well as several recurring voice actors and actresses for the show. This episode marks Ricardo Montalban's last role before his death.

Plot
Stan constantly makes promises to hang out with Roger but never fulfills his end of the bargain. Soon, he is assigned by the CIA to convince General Juanito Pequeño, the dictator of Isla Island, to sign a treaty in order to get a promotion at work (and a helicopter) and allow the US to mine the island's oil reserves. When Stan meets the general and accidentally kills him by telling him to eat his corndog whole, only to fall down an upwards escalator and die, he gets Roger to pose as the leader of the small island nation, leading to believe that they are staying at a hotel. Unfortunately, Roger's criticisms of certain things like the food or dusty floors ends up getting the servants killed, forcing Stan to trick Roger into signing the treaty pre-emptively.

However, Roger finds out about the plot when he double checks the parchment. Tired of Stan using him and abandoning him all the time, he decides to continue posing as the general and have Stan deported. He then changes the island's name (to Bananarama) and national anthem (to Venus by the namesake band) and starts commanding the people of Isla to paint the island yellow, but is not satisfied by the time it is half done and demands it be repainted turquoise. The people of Isla grow agitated and start planning a revolution.

As the CIA had no interest in stopping it, Stan realizes that using people is wrong and goes back to Isla to warn Roger. Unfortunately, he believes that Stan is going to use him again and throws him out of the palace, just as the revolution starts. Thinking quickly, Stan brings out the real general's corpse and calls out the rioters that their quarry is escaping. He then leaves the body in his helicopter before destroying it; Roger then realizes that Stan was right and heads right home. A new dictator is appointed (a dancing man seen earlier in the episode; he evidently keeps the change of at least the national anthem, as he and the citizens are seen dancing to it) and while initially loved by the people, an epilogue shows that he became known as El Bailarin de la Muerte ("The Dancer of Death"), and was the most brutal dictator in the island's history.

In a B-story, while Steve and his friends act out The Little Mermaid, Snot appears to be drowning in the pool when he is actually portraying a character from the movie. Francine quickly jumps in and saves him, holding him close to her breasts. Snot then starts to gloat about it to his gym class, only for Steve to find out and swear to get revenge. He feigns being injured to get touched by Snot's mother. Eventually, they realize that they have gone too far after Steve touches Snot's privates, which was planned for Francine.

Reception
"Moon Over Isla Island" was broadcast on October 4, 2009, as part of the animated television block on Fox. It was preceded by The Simpsons, and its sister shows The Cleveland Show and Family Guy. The episode was watched by 6.7 million homes during its initial airing, despite simultaneously airing with Desperate Housewives on ABC, Sunday Night Football on NBC, and Three Rivers on CBS. It received a 3.4 rating in the 18-49 demographic. The episode's total viewership and ratings slightly decreased from the previous episode, "In Country...Club", which was viewed by 7.12 million homes during its initial airing, and it garnered a 3.6 rating in the 18-49 demographic.

"Moon Over Isla Island" was met with mostly positive reception from television critics and fans alike. Emily St. James of The A.V. Club gave it a very positive review, writing, "This was pretty funny throughout. The idea of tossing Roger into the middle of a Banana republic and making him the dictator was inspired, especially as his personal obsessions somehow made him even more of a power-mad ruler than the old guy. American Dad’s political satire is always as broad and non-specific as possible, but this was a pretty amusing take on the U.S.’ relations with Latin American countries as well, and the attempts to tie everything in to some sort of personal story involving the characters – specifically Roger's desire to have Stan be his best friend and go pants shopping with him – worked better than it sometimes does." She also gave the subplot of the episode a positive review, going on to write, "The plot where Steve and Snot competed to see who could get whose mom to fondle whom in the most egregious fashion was a little overly broad, to be honest, but enough of the lines were amusing that the plot worked almost in spite of itself." In conclusion of her review, Emily would write, "American Dad sometimes wins the animation week by default, but this episode was actually and genuinely a fun piece of television." She went on the give the episode an A−, the highest grade of the night, scoring higher than The Simpsons episode "Bart Gets a 'Z', The Cleveland Show episode "Da Doggone Daddy-Daughter Dinner Dance", and Family Guy episode "Family Goy".

References

External links

2009 American television episodes
American Dad! (season 6) episodes
Television episodes about vacationing